Loon Mountain Ski Resort is a ski resort in Lincoln, Grafton County, New Hampshire, United States. It is located on Loon Mountain and sits within the White Mountain National Forest.

History 

The history of Loon Mountain Ski Resort can be traced back to former governor and New Hampshire native Sherman Adams. Adams spent much of his time growing up in the town of Lincoln, New Hampshire, and attended nearby Dartmouth College. After departing from his position of Chief of Staff in Eisenhower's cabinet, Adams proclaimed he went off "to operate a ski lodge" in 1958. Following his departure from Washington D.C, he founded Loon Mountain Corporation, which later contributed to the construction of Loon Mountain in the fall of 1965.

Loon Mountain officially opened in December 1966 with 12 trails over 80 acres. The terrain was served by a 4-passenger gondola and two Hall double chairlifts. A hotel was built the following year, and third double chairlift serving new advanced terrain was built in 1968.

More expansions followed over the next two decades. West Basin debuted in 1978, featuring a new base area, a dedicated beginner area, and another double chairlift. In 1985, the North Peak area was completed, featuring a CTEC triple and another lodge, and increasing Loon's vertical to 2,100 feet.

From the late 1980s to the early 90s, Loon began pursuing an expansion to the west. While the United States Forest Service approved the plan in 1993, the expansion was halted after two lawsuits were filed by the United States Court of Appeals for the First Circuit based on potential environmental impacts. These were not settled until 2001. A scaled-down proposal was approved and finally completed in 2007 as the South Peak complex. It now features a high-speed quad and 7 trails.

Today, Loon Mountain has a total 61 trails and 10 chairlifts, with most of the original lifts being been replaced. In 2021, Loon became the first resort in New England to install an 8-seat chairlift. It replaced a high-speed quad, which is slated to be refurbished and reused to replace the aging 7 Brothers Triple in 2022, increasing capacity out of the often-overcrowded Octagon base.

In November 2022, Loon Mountain ownership announced the construction of a South Peak beginners' area that will add over 30 skiable acres to the resort, thus surpassing Bretton Woods and becoming the largest ski mountain in New Hampshire. It was further indicated that this is the first step in a massive western expansion of the mountain that could nearly double its size and skiable area. In other areas of the mountain, the master plan also calls for increased snowmaking capacity and another expansion to the mountain's North Peak ski area.

Ownership History 
Loon Mountain was acquired by Booth Creek Ski Holdings in 1997. Booth Creek sold Loon Mountain to CNL Lifestyle in 2006, but continued to operate the resort. On September 19, 2007, Boyne Resorts, a Michigan-based resort company, announced it had acquired the lease to operate Loon from Booth Creek. It also increased the number of snow guns by 170 to a total of 600, at a total cost of $1.4 million. Loon Mountain was among several resorts sold by CNL to Och-Ziff Capital Management in 2016. Boyne purchased the ski area in March 2018 and has been operating it since.

Terrain and Lifts

Terrain 

Loon has 3 distinct peaks, and the following describes all terrain on the mountain from left to right:

North Peak: Located on the far left of Loon, North Peak is a modest open area with long intermediate trails, all serviced by the North Peak Express high-speed quad. Some notable trails of the summit areWalking Boss, Flume, Sunset, and Haulback. At the base of North Peak Express is the green trail Broadway (which goes down to Loon base) and the East Basin double, which can bring you to the summit of Loon.
Loon Peak: Right in the heart of Loon, serviced by the White Mountain Express Gondola is Loon Peak. Skiing off of the summit, the area features classic New England trails such as Exodus, Flying Fox, Bear Claw, Speakeasy, and Angel Street to name a few. The Gondola also provides access to North Peak, East Basin, Kanc8, and Tote Road Connector. 
South Peak: South Peak is Loon's most recent expansion, initially started in 1996 and finally finished in 2007 after various setbacks. South Peak is home to intermediate and advanced trails, and is easily accessible by taking the Tote Road Connector. Riders can take runs on Boom Run, Cruiser, Jobber, Twitcher, and the mountain's only double-black diamond trail, Ripsaw. Serviced by the Lincoln Express, the complex can be seen from the nearby town of Lincoln, while driving on Route 112.
Loon Mountain Parks: Running parallel to the White Mountain Gondola on both sides are the Loon Mountain terrain parks. Serviced by the Seven Brothers Express and Kanc 8, Loon is well-known for having 5 unique parks for every ability level. It was rated by Snowboard Magazine for being one of the best terrain parks in North America. The main park called Loon Mountain Park is off of skiers left on Grand Junction and features a dozen rails, jumps, and boxes annually. It also has a large halfpipe near the base of the gondola.

Lifts 

Loon has 10 chairlifts, with 2 Magic Carpets.

Gallery

References

External links

 Loon Mountain Ski Resort - Official site

Ski areas and resorts in New Hampshire
Tourist attractions in Grafton County, New Hampshire